Barrier Peak is a small 6,521 ft (1,988 m) summit located in Mount Rainier National Park in Pierce County of Washington state. It is part of the Cascade Range and is situated west of Cayuse Pass, 0.53 mile west-northwest of Buell Peak, and 0.4 mile south-southwest of Governors Ridge, which is its nearest higher peak. The normal climbing access is from the Owyhigh Lakes Trail. The peak was so named because it served as a barrier between the Cayuse Pass region and the rest of Mount Rainier National Park.

Climate

Barrier Peak is located in the marine west coast climate zone of western North America. Most weather fronts originate in the Pacific Ocean, and travel northeast toward the Cascade Mountains. As fronts approach, they are forced upward by the peaks of the Cascade Range (Orographic lift), causing them to drop their moisture in the form of rain or snowfall onto the Cascades. As a result, the west side of the North Cascades experiences high precipitation, especially during the winter months in the form of snowfall. During winter months, weather is usually cloudy, but, due to high pressure systems over the Pacific Ocean that intensify during summer months, there is often little or no cloud cover during the summer. Because of maritime influence, snow tends to be wet and heavy, resulting in high avalanche danger. Precipitation runoff from Barrier Peak drains into tributaries of the White River and Cowlitz River.

See also

 Geology of the Pacific Northwest

References

Gallery

External links
 Barrier Peak weather forecast
 National Park Service web site: Mount Rainier National Park
 2019 Climbing fatality on Barrier Peak: The News Tribune

Cascade Range
Mountains of Pierce County, Washington
Mountains of Washington (state)
Mount Rainier National Park